Rynn is a fictional character and protagonist of the Drakan series of fantasy action-adventure video games by Surreal Software, featured in the games Drakan: Order of the Flame and  Drakan: The Ancients' Gates, and in their comic book adaptation.

Appearances

Design and promotion
Rynn was made using a skeletal animation to make her motions as smooth and realistic as possible, with a very large at the time repertoire of 200 animations. According to Game Developer Magazine, "Rynn's highest polygon count was only 538. Single-skinned characters such as Rynn generally look much better with fewer polygons compared to the segmented characters traditionally used in most game animation systems." In the sequel, her model was built out of 3,000 polygons. Drakan was promoted by a Rynn model known as Myrna Blankenstein, who studied in San Francisco and originally came from Eastern Europe.

Reception
Rynn was very well received by video game media outlets and general public alike. Reviewing the first Drakan, David Wildgoose of PC PowerPlay wrote, "A scantily-clad girl involved in an unnatural relationship with a dragon - could you ask for anything else?" Many, including Hyper, France's Generation 4, Poland's Gambler, and German magazines Mega Fun, PowerPlay, PC Action, PC Games, PC Joker and PC Player, compared her to Lara Croft, often favorably. PC Zone opined the "busty heroine Rynn and her dragon could give Lara a run for her money" as "there's no point denying that Rynn is Lara Croft with swords and axes, and given teenagers' enthusiasm for Xena The Warrior Princess, she should prove a big hit among the testosterone-driven population of gamers." Computer & Video Games commented: "Could the heroine Rynn, be the new Lara Croft? Well the boobs certainly match up." Ritual Entertainment co-founder compared Julie from his game Heavy Metal: F.A.K.K.² to both Rynn and Lara.

In 2000, readers of GameSpot,  impressed "because not only was she a fighter but also she had a fire-breathing dragon, Arokh, as a loyal companion," voted her and Elexis Sinclaire from SiN together at eight spot in "Readers' Choice - The Ten Best Female Characters". That same year, IGN editor Tal Blevins chose her as "the hottest videogame babe" due to her looks and leather outfit. Rob Wright from Tom's Games included this "impulsive, strong-willed warrior" in his 2007 list of the 50 greatest female characters in video game history. When Edge "asked a variety of industry women for their favourite female videogame characters," Total War series' producer Luci Black chose Rynn: "Unashamedly hard as nails, nicely sharp and contemptuous attitude, looks great in armour and gets around on a dragon." GameStar included Rynn  in their 2008 list of "power women - the 25 heroines who dominated games" and featured her in a 2013 article discussing the graphical progress of "babes in games".

References

Action-adventure game characters
Fantasy video game characters
Female characters in video games
Fictional swordfighters in video games
Video game characters introduced in 1999
Video game characters who use magic
Woman soldier and warrior characters in video games